P47 or P-47 may refer to:

 , a submarine of the Royal Navy
 Hutchinson Air Force Station, a United States Air Force station closed in 1968
 , a corvette of the Indian Navy
 P-47: The Phantom Fighter, an arcade video game
 Papyrus 47, a biblical manuscript
 Phosphorus-47, an isotope of phosphorus
 Republic P-47 Thunderbolt, an American fighter aircraft
 W.A.R. P-47 Thunderbolt, a half-scale replica aircraft
 P47, a Latvian state regional road